Austroaeschna unicornis is a species of dragonfly in the family Telephlebiidae, 
known as the unicorn darner. It is found in eastern Australia, from Brisbane to Tasmania and around Adelaide in South Australia, where it inhabits rivers and streams.

Austroaeschna unicornis is a long-bodied, brown to black dragonfly with pale blue markings.

Gallery

Note
Until recently, Austroaeschna pinheyi was considered to be a subspecies of Austroaeschna unicornis.

See also
 List of dragonflies of Australia

References

  for a discussion of the status of this name.

Telephlebiidae
Odonata of Australia
Endemic fauna of Australia
Taxa named by René Martin
Insects described in 1901